Lee Gwang-ju (born 28 July 1938) is a South Korean boxer. He competed in the men's lightweight event at the 1960 Summer Olympics.

References

1938 births
Living people
South Korean male boxers
Olympic boxers of South Korea
Boxers at the 1960 Summer Olympics
Sportspeople from Seoul
Lightweight boxers